Francesco Cardinal Ragonesi S.T.D. J.U.D. (21 December 1850 – 14 September 1931) was a Cardinal of the Roman Catholic Church and was the Prefect of the Supreme Tribunal of the Apostolic Signatura.

Biography
Francesco Ragonesi was born in Bagnaia, Viterbo, Italy. He was educated at the seminary of Viterbo, and from 1869 at the Pio-Roman Seminary, and at the Pontifical Roman Athenaeum S. Apollinare, where he earned doctorates in philosophy, theology and a  doctorate utroque iuris (in both canon and civil law).

He was ordained in 1874 and worked in the diocese of Viterbo, where he did pastoral work and for twenty-five years served as a professor of history and Scripture in its seminary. He became archcanon of the cathedral chapter as well as being elected vicar capitular of the diocese. Between 1885 and 1904 he served as vicar general. He was created Domestic prelate of His Holiness on 12 June 1889. He was appointed Apostolic delegate and extraordinary envoy to Colombia on 7 September 1904. During his tenure, he favored the opening of the Panama Canal in that country.

He was appointed as titular archbishop of Myra on 16 September 1904 by Pope Pius X and was consecrated on 25 September by Rafael Merry del Val, Cardinal Secretary of State. He served as Nuncio in Spain with faculties of legate a latere from 1913 until 1921.

He was created Cardinal-Priest of San Marcello in the consistory of 7 March 1921 by Pope Benedict XV. Since he was Nuncio to Spain, he received his cardinal's hat from the King of Spain and then his other regalia at the next consistory in June.

He participated in the conclave of 1922 that elected Pope Pius XI. He was appointed as Prefect of the Apostolic Signatura by Pope Pius on 9 March 1926.

He died in 1931, in the mother-house of the Sisters of the Sacred Heart of Jesus, Poggio a Caiano, Pistoia, where he had gone to recover his health. He is buried at the Campo Verano cemetery in Rome.

Honours

Foreign Honours 
:

  Grand Cross with Collar of the Order of Charles III (20 August 1924)

References

20th-century Italian cardinals
Apostolic Nuncios to Colombia
Apostolic Nuncios to Spain
20th-century Italian Roman Catholic titular archbishops
1850 births
1931 deaths
Prefects of the Apostolic Signatura
Pontifical Roman Seminary alumni